António do Espírito Santo Fonseca (born April 26, 1951) is a former Cape Verdean politician and was the 3rd president of the National Assembly from 1996 to 2001. He succeeded Amílcar Spencer Lopes and was succeeded by Aristides Raimundo Lima.

References

External links
Biography at the National Assembly website (pdf)

1951 births
Living people
Cape Verdean diplomats
Presidents of the National Assembly (Cape Verde)
People from Santo Antão, Cape Verde
African Party for the Independence of Cape Verde politicians